Haasil (Eng: Result) is a Pakistani drama television series aired during 2016-17 on Geo Entertainment. It is produced by Huzu Productions and stars Ahsan Khan, Mawra Hocane and Sonya Hussain in leads. The series revolves around two friends with contrasting personalities and opposite family backgrounds.

Plot
Haasil is the story of two friends who have contrasting personalities and family backgrounds. Hareem (Mawra Hocane) is wealthy and has religious conviction while Rimsha (Sonya Hussain) is underprivileged, orphaned, and living with her sister. Rimsha’s parents had a dark past which is constantly brought up by close ones. This leads to a carefree attitude towards life and relationships. Due to her circumstances, (being abandoned and orphaned at a young age), she became a very different person compared to Hareem. 

One day, Hareem and Rimsha argue and Hareem questions Rimsha’s character, implying Rimsha is sleeping around with her different 'cousins'. After having a similar argument with her sister the previous night, this devastating statement hurts Rimsha, making her vow to get revenge. The two women turn into rivals. Will they mend their friendship or does Rimsha's quest to avenge this betrayal lead her on a path of ruin, for everyone involved?

Cast
Ahsan Khan as Junaid
Mawra Hocane as Hareem 
Sonya Hussain as Rimsha
Humayun Ashraf as Nabeel
Humaira Ali as Junaid's mother
Lubna Aslam
Mizna Waqas

Soundtrack 
The original soundtrack of "Haasil" is composed by Qasim Azhar while the lyrics and vocals are provided by Asim Azhar.

See also
List of programs broadcast by Geo TV

References

Pakistani drama television series
2016 Pakistani television series debuts
2016 Pakistani television series endings
Geo TV original programming